The Baradha people, also spelt Barada and Thar ar ra burra, and also known as Toolginburra, were an Aboriginal Australian people of Central Queensland not far inland from the east coast.

Country
They inhabited the area of the Connors River from Killarney north to Nebo. Their westward extension stopped around Bombandy. They were wedged between the coastal Koinjmal and the Barna to their west. Their northern borders met with those of the Wiri.

Social organisation
The Baradha, like the other Mackay area peoples, are said to have had two main social divisions, or phratries namely the Yungaroo and Wootaroo. These classificatory terms are applied not only to the constituent groups, but to all natural phenomena, which are ascribed to either one or the other of the two basic classes.

 Yungaroo are subdivided further into Gurgela and Gurgelan (male and female) and Bunbai and Bunnbaian.
 The Wootaroo are subdivided into Koobaroo and Koobarooan, masculine and feminine, and Woongo and Woongoan.

At least two distinct sub-branches or kin groups are known to have formed part of the Baradha.
 Thararburra (Thar-ar-ra-burra), centered around Cardowan.
 Toolginburra, a name related to their word for "hill", namely tulkun.

Language

The language spoken by the Baradha people was the Baradha dialect of the Biri language, which appears to be extinct, with no speakers recorded since before 1975.

History of contact
While sailing up Queensland’s east coast, Lieutenant James Cook sighted a group of mountains on the coastal plain of today’s Sunshine Coast, and named them the Glass House Mountains after the glass furnaces in Yorkshire. Aboriginal people had long used this area as a meeting place for ceremonies, trading, and gatherings. Cook first landed in Queensland at Round Hill (now known as Seventeen Seventy) on 24 May 1770.

The area around Mackay began to be colonised in 1860, and, according to George Bridgeman,
During the eight or ten years which followed, about one-half of the aboriginal population was either shot down by the Native Mounted Police and their officers, or perished from introduced loathsome diseases before unknown.'

Bridgeman named the Baradha (Toolginburra) as one of the four Mackay tribes that suffered from this decimation, part of the Australian frontier wars occurring throughout the colonies. Though the "dispersal" shootings are thought to have accounted for the majority of deaths, a measles epidemic struck the survivors in 1876, drastically reducing their numbers, and, according to one estimation, the remnants of the original people in 1880 amounted to no more than 100 people, with 80 evenly divided between men and women, and the remainder their children.

Alternative names
 Thar-ar-ra-burra/Tha-ra-ra-burra. (horde at Cardowan)
 Toolginburra

Natural resource management

A Traditional Owner Reference Group consisting of representatives of the Yuwibara, Koinmerburra, Barada Barna, Wiri, Ngaro, and those Gia and Juru people whose lands are within Reef Catchments Mackay Whitsunday Isaac region, helps to support natural resource management and look after the cultural heritage sites in the area.

Notes

Citations

Sources

Aboriginal peoples of Queensland